LeRoy Township is one of the five townships of Lake County, Ohio, United States. As of the 2010 census the population was 3,253.

Geography
Located in the eastern part of the county, it borders the following townships:
Perry Township - north
Madison Township - northeast
Thompson Township, Geauga County - east
Montville Township, Geauga County - southeast corner
Hambden Township, Geauga County - south
Concord Township - west
Painesville Township - northwest corner

No municipalities are located in LeRoy Township.

The Grand River forms the northern boundary of the township.

Name and history
Named for Le Roy, New York, the home of many of the township's earliest settlers, it is the only LeRoy Township statewide. Its name is often spelled "Leroy" and sometimes "Le Roy."

The first settlers in what is now LeRoy Township were Paul and Elijah Clapp, who arrived in 1802. LeRoy Township was established in 1820, but it was not made part of Lake County until 1840. During the Civil War, forty men from LeRoy Township served in the Union Army.

The January 1986 Northeastern Ohio earthquake occurred in the southwestern portion of the township.

Government
The township is governed by a three-member board of trustees, who are elected in November of odd-numbered years to a four-year term beginning on the following January 1. Two are elected in the year after the presidential election and one is elected in the year before it. There is also an elected township fiscal officer, who serves a four-year term beginning on April 1 of the year after the election, which is held in November of the year before the presidential election. Vacancies in the fiscal officership or on the board of trustees are filled by the remaining trustees.  As of 2019, the board is composed of chairman Chuck Klco and members Heather Shelton and Richard VanPelt, and the clerk is Julie Himmelman.

See also
 Interstate 90 Grand River bridges

References

External links

Lake County website

Townships in Lake County, Ohio
Townships in Ohio